Tonto Creek is a  stream located in the Mogollon Rim area of the state of Arizona on the north edge of the Tonto National Forest. Tonto Creek is a stream that flows year round, starting just below the Mogollon Rim, at the northern edge of Tonto National Forest. The creek continues its descent through the Hellsgate Wilderness area and eventually into a wide valley in the Sonoran Desert. It continues through the desert and into the Salt River within the north end of Theodore Roosevelt Lake. The facilities are maintained by Tonto National Forest division of the USDA Forest Service.

Fish species 
Fish in the stream include rainbow trout, brown trout, and brook trout.

See also 
 List of rivers of Arizona

References

External links 
 Arizona Fishing Locations Map
 Arizona Boating Locations Facilities Map

Rivers of the Mogollon Rim
Rivers of Arizona
Rivers of Gila County, Arizona
Tributaries of the Salt River (Arizona)